Hoodia macrantha is a succulent plant native to Namibia and the Cape Province of South Africa. It is regarded by some sources as a synonym of the accepted name for the plant, Hoodia currorii subsp. currorii.

References

Flora of Southern Africa
macrantha